Bak Seon-yeong is the Revised Romanisation spelling of a Korean name (박선영) with various English spellings, among them Park Sun-young. It may refer to:
Birth name of Hyomin (born 1989), South Korean female singer, member of girl group T-ara
Birth name of Luna (South Korean singer) (born 1993), South Korean female singer, member of girl group f(x)
Bak Seon-yeong (politician), South Korean politician, member of the Advancement Unification Party
Bak Seon-yeong (voice actress) (born 1970), South Korean voice actress
Park Sun-young (actress) (born 1976), South Korean actress
Park Sun-young (badminton) (born 1985), South Korean badminton player
Park Sun-young (taekwondo), South Korean taekwondo practitioner